In Another World may refer to:
In Another World (Cheap Trick album)
In Another World (Joe Diffie album)
"In Another World" (song), the album's title track